Arkadiusz Rafał Głowacki (born 13 March 1979) is a Polish former professional footballer who played as a defender.

Club career
Głowacki made his Ekstraklasa debut on 7 May 1997 in a match against Amica Wronki. In 2000, he moved to Wisła Kraków from Lech Poznań. In 2005 Głowacki was chosen as the new Wisła Kraków captain. He was named to the Ekstraklasa Best XI in the 2007–08 season as well as in 2009 in Polish Footballers' Association voting. In 2009, he was chosen the best defender in Poland by Ekstraklasa players. During his eleven seasons at Wisła Kraków, Głowacki won the Ekstraklasa championship six times.

On 15 June 2010, he signed a two-year contract with Turkish club Trabzonspor. Głowacki made his debut for the club in the 2010 Turkish Super Cup final, starting alongside Egemen Korkmaz in the heart of the defense. Głowacki spent two seasons at Trabzonspor, playing in the UEFA Champions League group stage in 2011–12.

International career
Głowacki made his debut for the Poland national team in 2002, and subsequently he was called up to the 23-man squad for 2002 FIFA World Cup. He played regularly for the national team until 2006 when Leo Beenhakker gave up him after only one match. After Beenhakker was sacked, Głowacki received a recall to the national side for the 2010 FIFA World Cup qualifiers against the Czech Republic and Slovakia by interim Polish manager Stefan Majewski. He earned his 20th and 21st caps as a starter in both matches which saw Poland succumb to defeat, ending their World Cup qualification hopes. New manager Franciszek Smuda had also selected him to play against Romania and Canada, but he sustained an injury in club action which ruled him out for those matches.

Career statistics

Club

International

Honours 

Wisła Kraków
 Ekstraklasa: 2000–01, 2002–03, 2003–04, 2004–05, 2007–08, 2008–09
 Polish Cup: 2001–02, 2002–03
 Ekstraklasa Cup: 2000–01
 Polish SuperCup: 2001

Trabzonspor
 Turkish Super Cup: 2010

Individual
 Ekstraklasa Defender of the Year: 2009
 Ekstraklasa Best XI: 2007–08, 2009

References

External links

1979 births
Living people
Polish footballers
Poland international footballers
Polish expatriate footballers
Lech Poznań players
Wisła Kraków players
Trabzonspor footballers
2002 FIFA World Cup players
Footballers from Poznań
Ekstraklasa players
Süper Lig players
Expatriate footballers in Turkey
Association football defenders